Turnbull is a northern English and Scottish surname. For theories of its etymology, see Clan Turnbull.

Notable people with the surname include:

 Agnes Sligh Turnbull (1888–1982), American writer
 Alan Turnbull (disambiguation)
 Albert Turnbull (1866–1929), New Zealand cricketer
 Alexander Turnbull (disambiguation)
 Alison Turnbull (born 1956), British painter and sculptor
 Andrew Turnbull (disambiguation)
 Ann Turnbull (born 1943), British writer of fiction for children and young adults
 Annie Turnbull (1898–2010), British supercentenarian
 Art Turnbull (born 1934), Australian rugby union wing
 Barbara Turnbull (1965–2015), Canadian quadriplegic news reporter and activist
 Barbara Turnbull (nurse) (fl. 2010s), New Zealand nurse
 Belle Turnbull (1881–1970), American poet
 Bernard Turnbull (1904–1984), Wales rugby union captain
 Bertrand Turnbull (1887–1943), Welsh field hockey player
 Bill Turnbull (1956–2022), British television presenter
 Blayre Turnbull (born 1993), Canadian ice hockey player
 Bob Turnbull (1894–1946), Scottish footballer
 Bobby Turnbull (1895–1952), English football outside right
 Campbell Turnbull (1898–1977), Australian politician
 Charles Turnbull (cricketer) (1851–1920), English cricketer
 Charles Wesley Turnbull (1935-2022), governor of the U.S. Virgin Islands
 Clive Turnbull (1906–1975), Australian author and journalist
 Colin Turnbull (1924–1994), anthropologist and author
 David Turnbull (disambiguation)
 Derek Turnbull (1926–2006), New Zealand long-distance runner
 Derek Turnbull (rugby union) (born 1961), Scottish rugby union player
 Don Turnbull (disambiguation)
 Dorotea Turnbull, Argentine Olympic swimmer
 Doug Turnbull (1903–1993), American lacrosse player
 Sir Douglass Turnbull, Professor of Neurology at the Newcastle University
 Drew Turnbull, Andrew "Drew" Turnbull (c. 1930 – 2012), Scottish rugby league footballer of the 1950s for Leeds and Great Britain
 Eddie Turnbull (1923–2011), Scottish football player and manager
 Elizabeth Turnbull (1885–1988), New Zealand woollen mill worker
 Frank Turnbull (born 1954), Canadian ice hockey goaltender
 Franklin White Turnbull (1881–1971), member of the House of Commons of Canada (1930–1935)
 Fred Turnbull (disambiguation)
 Gael Turnbull (1924–2004), Scottish poet who was an important precursor of the British Poetry Revival
 Gareth Turnbull (born 1979), Irish middle-distance runner
 George Turnbull (disambiguation)
 Gordon Turnbull, British psychiatrist
 Grace Turnbull (1880–1976), American painter, sculptor and writer
 H. Rutherford Turnbull (born 1937), American author and educator
 Hector Turnbull (businessman) (1733–1788), Perthshire, Scotland
 Hector Turnbull (1884–1934), American screenwriter and film producer
 Herbert Turnbull (1885–1961), English mathematician
 Hilda Turnbull (born 1942), Australian politician, member of the West Australian Legislative Assembly (1989–2001)
 Hubert Maitland Turnbull (1875–1955), British pathologist
 Ian Turnbull (disambiguation)
 Jack Turnbull (footballer) (1885–1917), Australian rules footballer
 Jack Turnbull (1910–1944), American lacrosse player
 James Turnbull, Australian author
 James Turnbull (politician), (died 1846), Nova Scotia lawyer and politician
 James Turnbull (steamboat captain), first to ascend the Colorado River by steamboat in November 1852.
 James Youll Turnbull (1883–1916), Scottish recipient of the Victoria Cross in World War I
 Jay Turnbull (1911 – 1992), Scottish footballer
 Jessica Turnbull (born 1995), Australian squash player
 Jessie Turnbull (1845–1920), Canadian women's rights activist
 Jimmy Turnbull (1884 – not earlier than 1909), Scottish footballer
 John Turnbull (disambiguation)
 Jonathan Turnbull (born 1962), English cricketer
 Jordan Turnbull (born 1994), English football central defender
 Joseph Turnbull (c. 1725 – 1775), English musician, player of the Northumbrian smallpipes
 Josh Turnbull (born 1988), Wales international rugby union player
 Keith Turnbull (1907–1978), Australian politician, member of the Victorian Legislative Assembly (1950–1964)
 Ken Turnbull (c. 1921 – 2008), Canadian football player 
 Koi Turnbull (born 1976), comics artist
 Lee Turnbull (disambiguation)
 Lindsay Turnbull (born 1930), Australian rules footballer
 Lucinha Turnbull (born 1953), Brazilian musician
 Lucy Turnbull (born 1958), former Lord Mayor of Sydney and wife of businessman and fellow politician, Malcolm Turnbull
 Malcolm Turnbull (born 1954), Australian politician; 29th Prime Minister of Australia
 Margaret Turnbull, American astronomer who developed a catalog of potentially habitable solar systems
 Margaret Turnbull (screenwriter) (1872–1942), Scottish playwright and screenwriter
 Marjorie R. Turnbull (born 1940), member of the Florida House of Representatives
 Mark Turnbull (born 1973), Australian sailor and 2000 Olympic champion
 Mary Turnbull (Constance Mary Turnbull''', C. M. Turnbull; 1927–2008), British historian
 Maurice Turnbull (1905–1944), Welsh cricketer, rugby union player, and soldier
 Michael Turnbull (disambiguation)
 Murray Turnbull (1919–2014), American artist and art educator
 Nick Turnbull (born 1981), American football safety
 Noel Turnbull (Oswald Graham Noel Turnbull; 1890–1970), British tennis player
 Norm Turnbull (1894–1977), Australian rules footballer
 Norman Turnbull (songwriter) (1879–1954), British songwriter
 Norman Turnbull (1900–1986), Canadian politician
 Olaf Turnbull (1917–2004), Canadian farmer, educator and politician
 Olga and Betty Turnbull, English child entertainers in the 1930s
 Oliver Turnbull (1919–2009), Scotland rugby union player
 Paul Turnbull (born 1989), English football midfielder
 Percival Turnbull (1862–1937), New Zealand cricketer  
 Percy Turnbull (1902–1976), English composer and pianist 
 Perry Turnbull (born 1959), retired National Hockey League player
 Peter Turnbull (disambiguation)
 Phil Turnbull (born 1987), English footballer
 Philip Turnbull (1879–1930), Welsh field hockey player
 Phipps Turnbull, Scottish rugby union player
 Randy Turnbull (born 1962), Canadian ice hockey defenceman
 Ray Turnbull (disambiguation)
 Reg Turnbull, (1908–2006), Australian politician
 Renaldo Turnbull (born 1966), American football linebacker
 Richard Turnbull (colonial administrator) (1909–1998), last governor of the British mandate of Tanganyika (1958–1961)
 Richard Turnbull (theologian) (born 1960), principal of Wycliffe Hall, Oxford
 Rivers Turnbull (1855–1927), English cricketer
 Robert Turnbull (disambiguation)
 Roland Evelyn Turnbull (1905–1960), British colonial administrator and Governor of North Borneo
 Ronnie Turnbull (1922–1966), English football centre forward
 Ross Turnbull (ice hockey) (1934–2015), Canadian ice hockey wing 
 Ross Turnbull (rugby union) (1941–2015), Australian rugby union player
 Ross Turnbull (born 1985), English footballer
 Roz Turnbull (born 1972), New Zealand actress
 Ryan Turnbull (born 1971), former Australian rules footballer
 Sandy Turnbull, Scottish football player who died in World War I
 Sara Little Turnbull (1917–2015), American product designer
 Scott Turnbull (born 1981), English actor.
 Simon Turnbull (1950–2014), Australian entrepreneur and self-proclaimed psychic
 Spencer Turnbull (born 1992), American baseball pitcher
 Stephen Turnbull (disambiguation)
 Steven Turnbull (rugby union) (born 1987), Scottish rugby union player
 Stuart Turnbull (born 1947), American economist
 Stuart Turnbull (basketball) (born 1984), Canadian basketball player
 Susan Turnbull, American Democratic organiser
 Thomas Turnbull (1824–1907), New Zealand architect
 Thomas Scott Turnbull (1825–1880), Mayor of Sunderland, founder of a daily provincial newspaper, Sunderland Echo''
 Tommy Turnbull, fictional character in Robotboy
 Travis Turnbull (born 1986), American-German ice hockey player
 Wallace Rupert Turnbull (1879–1954), Canadian inventor
 Walter Turnbull (1944–2007), American musician
 Wendy Turnbull (born 1952), Australian tennis player
 William Turnbull (disambiguation)
 Winton Turnbull (1899–1980), Australian politician.

Given name

 John Turnbull Thomson (1821–1884), British-born civil engineer

See also 
 Clan Turnbull
 Turnbull (disambiguation)

References 

English-language surnames
Surnames of Lowland Scottish origin